Bojan Najdenov (born August 27, 1991), is a Macedonian footballer who plays as a midfielder for Lokomotiv Tashkent of the Uzbekistan Pro League.

Club career
Bojan was a player of Horizont Turnovo In 2010–2015, in which he played in the Macedonian First League of 128 matches and scored eight goals. In the first round of the 2012/2013 season he was on loan in the Macedonian Second League of Miravci.

In 2015–2016 he performed in Rabotnički Skopje. In the 2016/2017 season, in which he won the bronze medal of the Macedonian First League with his club, he played 30 matches and scored four goals in meetings with: Makedonija Ǵórcze Petrow Skopje (4: 0–10 August 2016, 2: 1–15 October 2016), Pobeda Prilep (1: 2–28 September 2016, 3: 1–30 November 2016). In the 2017/2018 season he appeared in four qualifying matches for the Europa League, in which he scored three goals.

At the end of August 2017, he joined Smouha SC. He played four matches in the Egyptian Premier League. In January 2018 he was tested in Korona Kielce (played in two sparrings), with which he was in the preparatory camp in Turkey. However, he was not a player of the Kielce club.

Esteghlal
On 5 February 2018, Najdenov signed a one-and-a-half year contract with the Iranian club Esteghlal.

International career
He first made his mark on the international scene with Macedonia national team at the 18 June 2014 in an international friendly game against China. As of April 2020, he has earned a total of 4 caps, scoring no goals.

Style of play
Najdenov a deep-lying playmaker characterized by accurate accuracy of long distances and its passes charming and influential and also features tactical performance and defense insurance.

Honours

Club
Esteghlal
Hazfi Cup: 2017–18

References

External links

Bojan Najdenov at footballdatabase.eu

1991 births
Living people
Association football midfielders
Macedonian footballers
North Macedonia international footballers
FK Horizont Turnovo players
FK Rabotnički players
Smouha SC
Esteghlal F.C. players
KF Laçi players
Akademija Pandev players
Macedonian First Football League players
Macedonian Second Football League players
Egyptian Premier League players
Persian Gulf Pro League players
Kategoria Superiore players
Macedonian expatriate footballers
Expatriate footballers in Egypt
Expatriate footballers in Iran
Macedonian expatriate sportspeople in Iran
Expatriate footballers in Albania
Macedonian expatriate sportspeople in Albania